Presidential elections were held in Mali on 12 April 1992, with a second round on 26 April. They were the first presidential elections in the country to feature more than one candidate following the reintroduction of multi-party democracy after a coup the previous year. The coup had followed a student protest in March 1991 during which troops defending President Moussa Traoré fired and killed numerous protesters. The result was a victory for Alpha Oumar Konaré of the Alliance for Democracy in Mali, who defeated Tiéoulé Mamadou Konaté of the Sudanese Union – African Democratic Rally.

Results

References

Mali
1992 in Mali
Presidential elections in Mali
April 1992 events in Africa